Jeff Paris may refer to:

 Jeff Paris (mathematician) (born 1944), British mathematician
 Jeff Paris (musician), American vocalist, keyboardist and guitarist